Nestor Ivanovych Shufrych (born 29 December 1966) is a Ukrainian politician who has served in the Verkhovna Rada since 1998.

Early life and education
Shufrych was born on 29 December 1966 in Uzhorod, Ukrainian SSR, USSR. His paternal ancestors were ethnic Serbs.

Shufrych graduated from the Uzhhorod National University in 1992 with a diploma in history. In 2004, he wrote a thesis ""Development and Transformation of agrarian industry in Hungary" earning him an academical honors of a Candidate of Economical Sciences from the Institute of Agrarian Economics (Ukrainian Agrarian Academy of Sciences).

In 1985–87 Shufrych served in the Soviet military, afterwards he became an interpreter for a trade-revenue company in Uzhhorod. In 1989 Shufrych became an adviser of cooperative union "Retro" and commercial director of the Soviet-Austrian company "Tekop". Since 1991 Shufrych worked as a director for the Ukrainian-American company "West-Contrade", becoming its president in 1995.

Politics
In 1996 and through 2007, Shufrych was a member of the Social Democratic Party of Ukraine (united) (SDPU(o)) which was headed by former President Leonid Kravchuk. In 2005, Shufrych became the First Deputy Leader of the party.

In 1998, Shufrych was elected from the 70th electoral district in Zakarpattia Oblast from SDPU(o), the 22nd on the party list. He gathered 16.8% out of 12 candidates with 70.8% of voting in the district. At the time of elections Shufrych was a director of "West-Contrade".
 1998 – 2000 Parliamentary committee on economic policy, management of public economics, property, and investments
 1998 Control commission on privatization
 1998 Plenipotentiary representative of SDPU(o)
 1999 National council on youth policy for the President of Ukraine (Leonid Kuchma)
 2001 – 2002 Parliamentary committee on Budget

In 2002, Shufrych unsuccessfully ran as member of SDPU(o), finishing third out 20 candidates and gathering 9.2% of the vote. He was, however, elected to the Zakarpattia Oblast Council. In three months he successfully ran in the 201st electoral district in Cherkasy Oblast as a self-nominated candidate. Shufrych gathered 29.8% out of 18 other candidates. At the time of elections he was a president of the "Cherkasy meat company" and a member of SDPU(o).
 2002 Parliamentary group of SDPU(o)
 2003 Parliamentary committee on Budget

In 2006, Shufrych ran by a party list from the Opposition Bloc "Not So!", being listed the 4th from SDPU(o). The bloc lost its elections earning 1.01% nationwide, with a 3% parliamentary threshold. However, he managed to be elected to the Verkhovna Rada of Crimea from the bloc. As part of the 2006 Ukrainian political crisis, Shufrych was appointed as Head of the State Emergency Service of Ukraine in the Second Yanukovych government.

In 2007, Shufrych ran by a party list from the Party of Regions, being listed the 5th for the 2007 Ukrainian parliamentary election. The party won the elections, earning 34.4% nationwide with 3% parliamentary threshold.

On 23 November 2012, President Yanukovych dismissed Shufrych from the position of deputy secretary of the National Security and Defense Council of Ukraine because he was re-elected into parliament in the 2012 Ukrainian parliamentary election. He was No. 27 on the Party of Regions electoral list.

Shufrych himself claimed the government had appealed to him to contribute to the mediation of Viktor Medvedchuk.

On 30 September 2014, Shufrych was beaten and injured by a mob in Odessa.

In the 2014 Ukrainian parliamentary election, Shufrych was again re-elected into parliament; this time after placing 11th on the electoral list of Opposition Bloc. In November 2017, Shufrych joined Opposition Platform — For Life. Shufrych was re-elected, placed 7th on the party list of Opposition Platform — For Life, in the 2019 Ukrainian parliamentary election.

2022 brawl and arrest 
On 18 February 2022, during a panel show, Shufrych was physically assaulted and put into a headlock by journalist  after he refused to condemn Vladimir Putin's actions in Donbass and Crimea. This brawl was on live television and was broadcast all around the world.

On 4 March 2022, Shufrych was arrested for allegedly providing the invading Russian Armed Forces with locations and other intel about the Armed Forces of Ukraine during the 2022 Russian invasion of Ukraine.

Personal life 
Shufrych's paternal ancestors were ethnic Serbs.

Shufrych is a former member of the National Olympic Committee of Ukraine. He left the National Olympic Committee in January 2023.

References

External links
 
 Profile at Liga.net 
 Profile at the Verkhovna Rada website 

1966 births
Living people
Politicians from Uzhhorod
Social Democratic Party of Ukraine (united) politicians
Party of Regions politicians
Opposition Bloc politicians
Opposition Platform — For Life politicians
Emergency ministers of Ukraine
Third convocation members of the Verkhovna Rada
Fourth convocation members of the Verkhovna Rada
Sixth convocation members of the Verkhovna Rada
Seventh convocation members of the Verkhovna Rada
Eighth convocation members of the Verkhovna Rada
Ninth convocation members of the Verkhovna Rada
People of the 2014 pro-Russian unrest in Ukraine
Ukrainian football chairmen and investors
Ukrainian collaborators with Russia
FC Hoverla Uzhhorod
Ukrainian people of Serbian descent